Daniel Pedreira Senna Pellegrine (30 October 1992 – 7 July 2013), better known by his stage name MC Daleste, was a Brazilian funk paulista singer, songwriter and rapper.

Early life and career
MC Daleste was born in Penha, São Paulo, Brazil. He began his career in 2009, composing his first funk songs and had his first hit after releasing "Pedra da Exaltação".

Death 
Daleste was fatally shot in the abdomen while performing during a free show in Campinas, São Paulo He died later the same day in Paulínia's City Hospital. Police in Campinas claim to be continuing to investigate the shooting with approximately one hundred testimonials, videos, and photos received. A number of pictures taken from the stage have been deemed fundamental to the case by an investigator.

The Brazilian funk scene has turned violent within the last couple of years with a number of MCs being killed including Felipe Boladão, MC Careca, MC Primo, and MC Duda Marapé, in addition to Daleste.

Discography

Albums
Inquebrável (2013)

Singles
(selective)
"Angra dos Reis"
"Apologia"
"Todas as Quebradas"
"Mais Amor, Menos Recalque"
"Mãe de Traficante"
"Voz Estranha"
"Água na Boca"
"Ipanema"
"Quem é?"
"O Gigante Acordou!"
"Deusa da Ostentação"
"Ostentação Fora do Normal" (part. MC Léo da Baixada)
"São Paulo"
"Em Teu Olhar"
"Nunca Vendeu Maconha"
"Voz Estranha"
"Pra Ser Fiel"
"Fase Boa"
"Verdadeira Namorada"
"Apologia"
"Paquera de Escola"
"Bonde Dos Menor"

See also
 List of unsolved murders
 List of murdered hip hop musicians

References

1992 births
2013 deaths
Assassinated people
21st-century Brazilian male singers
21st-century Brazilian singers
Brazilian murder victims
Brazilian rappers
Brazilian songwriters
Deaths by firearm in Brazil
Filmed deaths of entertainers
Funk carioca musicians
Male murder victims
Musicians from São Paulo
People murdered in Brazil
Singers from São Paulo
Unsolved murders in Brazil